is a town located in Sōya Subprefecture, Hokkaido, Japan. The district and town both cover the island of the same name: Rebun Island. Rebun Island is famous for its alpine flowers.

Geography
The town covers the entire area of Rebun Island in the Sea of Japan. The entire island is part of the Rishiri-Rebun-Sarobetsu National Park. Lake Kushu and Mount Rebun (Rebun's highest point) are located in the town.

Rebun is well known for its 300 species of alpine flowers, some of which are endemic to the island. For this it has earned the moniker the island of flowers. Such flowers include: .

Climate

Demographics
Per Japanese census data, the population of Rebun has declined in recent decades.

Arts and culture
Rebun hosts a flower festival every year.

Mascot

Rebun's mascot is  who is a Rebun lady's slipper orchid (a type of the large-flowered cypripedium orchid species). As a flower, its gender is unknown, but its feelings are gentle and calm. It is known to like nature. Its heart (its charm point) is actually the seed of happiness from fourteen different native flowers. However, it will not tolerate anyone harming nature (especially seedlings). If damage is done to nature, its heart will stop beating. It was unveiled in September 2012.

Airspace violations
With its location in the far north of Japan, Rebun has been the site of the most violations of Japanese airspace. From 1967 to 2017 14 of the 39 violations of Japanese airspace have been near Rebun. This is the most of any location in Japan. They were all by either Soviet aircraft during the Cold War or by Russian aircraft after 1991.

Sister cities
Ohasama, Iwate (Currently Hanamaki)
Yutaka, Hiroshima (Currently Kure)

References

External links

Official Website 

Towns in Hokkaido